N709 may refer to:

 N709 an exact equivalent of the thermionic valve EL84
 Provincial road N709 (Netherlands)
 N709 (Bangladesh), the Khulna City Bypass

See also
 N709PA the registration of Pan Am Flight 214 which was destroyed by lightning